Jacob Kwashi is an Anglican  bishop in Nigeria: he is the current Bishop of Zonkwa, one of 13 dioceses within the Anglican Province of Abuja, itself one of 14 provinces within the Church of Nigeria.

Kwashi became Bishop of Zonkwa in September 2011, having previously been Dean of St Michael's Cathedral in Kaduna. His older brother, Benjamin Kwashi is the Archbishop of the Province of Jos.

Notes

Living people
Anglican bishops of Zonkwa
21st-century Anglican bishops in Nigeria
Year of birth missing (living people)